Harry Rosenthal (15 May c. 1893 – 10 May 1953) was an orchestra leader, composer, pianist and actor.

Biography 
Rosenthal was born in Belfast in 1893, and by the 1920s he was in London where he had a thriving musical career as a composer, bandleader and pianist, including composing five operettas which met with great success.  He came to the United States by 1929, when he wrote songs for Herbert Stothart's musical Polly on Broadway, and in 1930 acted in Ring Lardner and George S. Kaufman's play June Moon, which was revived in 1933.  After he met Edward, the Prince of Wales at a reception, he accompanied the heir to the British throne on a world tour.

Rosenthal's film career began in 1931 and ended in 1948, during which time he worked on 19 films, playing pianists, orchestra leaders and also non-musical roles, as well as composing music (for The Sin of Harold Diddlebock) and conducting (on For Me and My Gal).  In the early 1940s, Rosenthal was part of writer-director Preston Sturges' unofficial "stock company" of character actors, appearing in all of Sturges' films from The Great McGinty (1940) through The Sin of Harold Diddlebock (1947) with the exception of Hail the Conquering Hero.

Both in New York and in Hollywood, Rosenthal was often mentioned in gossip columns, surprisingly so, given the small size of the parts he played.  His death in 1953, from a heart attack, was similarly noted.

Filmography

References

External links 

 
 
 
 
 

1890s births
1953 deaths
American male composers
American male film actors
American male stage actors
Irish emigrants to the United States
Irish Jews
20th-century American male actors
20th-century American composers
20th-century American male musicians